Mohubani  is a village in Dhanbad District, in the Indian state of Jharkhand. It is known as "the coal capital of India".

Etymology
The name "Mohubani" may be derived from the words "mohua" - a kind of tree flower used to make a drink, and "ban" -  a forest.

Geography and climate
It is 15 km from Dhanbad station, 18 km from Sindri, 12 km from Govindpur, 10 km from baliapur. Its nearest railway station and post office is chhota Ambona nearly 2 km from village, and its thana is Govindpur.

Mohubani features climate that is transitional between a humid subtropical climate and a tropical wet and dry climate. Summer starts from last week of March and ends in mid-June. Peak temperature in summer can reach 47 °C. Dhanbad also receives heavy rainfall. In winter, the minimum temperature remains around 12 °C with a maximum of 22 °C.  Forests present are of a northern tropical dry deciduous type. In many of these forests, people are engaged in sericulture.

Language
Hindi and Bengali are  widely spoken.  In addition, several tribal languages are also spoken, including Khortha.

References

https://web.archive.org/web/20040616075334/http://www.censusindia.net/results/town.php?stad=A&state5=999 Census Commission of India. Archived from http://www.censusindia.net/results/town.php?stad=A&state5=999 on 2004-06-16.  Retrieved 2012-02-29.

Villages in Dhanbad district